Brian Baker and Sam Groth were the defending champions but chose not to defend their title.

Denis Kudla and Danny Thomas won the title after Jarryd Chaplin and Miķelis Lībietis retired leading 7–6(7–4), 4–1 in the final.

Seeds

Draw

References
 Main Draw
 Qualifying Draw

Charlottesville Men's Pro Challenger - Doubles
2017 Doubles